Eleventh Army or 11th Army may refer to:

Germany
 11th Army (German Empire), a World War I field Army
 11th Army (Wehrmacht), a World War II field army
 11th SS Panzer Army

Russia
 11th Army (Russian Empire) 
 11th Army (RSFSR)
 11th Army (Soviet Union)
 11th Air Army (Russia)

Others
 Eleventh Army (Japan)
 Eleventh Army (Italy)
 Eleventh Army (Austria-Hungary)
 11th Army Group (United Kingdom)